Damron Nienaber Commercial Block was a historic commercial building located in downtown Evansville, Indiana.  It was built in 1884. It has been demolished.

It was listed on the National Register of Historic Places in 1982 and delisted in 1989.

References

Former National Register of Historic Places in Indiana
Commercial buildings on the National Register of Historic Places in Indiana
Commercial buildings completed in 1884
Buildings and structures in Evansville, Indiana
National Register of Historic Places in Evansville, Indiana